The Serie B 1976–77 was the forty-fifth tournament of this competition played in Italy since its creation.

Teams
Monza, Rimini and Lecce had been promoted from Serie C, while Ascoli, Como and Cagliari had been relegated from Serie A.

Final classification

Results

Promotion tie-breaker

Atalanta and Pescara promoted to Serie A.

References and sources
Almanacco Illustrato del Calcio - La Storia 1898-2004, Panini Edizioni, Modena, September 2005

Serie B seasons
2
Italy